The University of Hong Kong (HKU; Chinese: 香港大學) is a public research university in Pok Fu Lam, Hong Kong. Founded in 1887 as the Hong Kong College of Medicine for Chinese, it is the oldest tertiary institution in Hong Kong.

As of December 2022, HKU ranks 21st internationally and third in Asia by QS, and 31st internationally and fourth in Asia by Times Higher Education. It has been ranked as the most international university in the world as well as one of the most prestigious universities in Asia. Today, HKU has ten academic faculties with English as the main language of instruction.

The University of Hong Kong was also the first team in the world to successfully isolate the coronavirus SARS-CoV, the causative agent of SARS.

History

Founding

The origins of The University of Hong Kong can be traced back to the Hong Kong College of Medicine for Chinese founded in 1887 by Ho Kai later known as Sir Kai Ho Kai, which was later incorporated as the university's faculty of medicine. It was renamed the Hong Kong College of Medicine in 1907. The college became HKU's medical school in 1911.

The University of Hong Kong was founded in 1911. Governor Sir Frederick Lugard had proposed to establish a university in Hong Kong to compete with the other Great Powers opening universities in China, most notably Prussia, which had just opened the Tongji German Medical School in Shanghai. Sir Hormusjee Naorojee Mody, an Indian Parsi businessman in Hong Kong, learned of Lugard's plan and pledged to donate HK$150,000 towards the construction and HK$30,000 towards other costs. The Hong Kong Government and the business sector in southern China, which were both equally eager to learn "secrets of the West's success" (referring to technological advances made since the Industrial Revolution), also gave their support. The Government contributed a site at West Point. Swire Group contributed £40,000 to endow a chair in Engineering, in addition to thousands of dollars in equipment (its aim was partly to bolster its corporate image following the death of a passenger on board one of its ships, SS Fatshan, and the subsequent unrest stirred by the Self-Government Society). Along with donations from other donors including the British government and companies such as HSBC, Lugard finally had enough to fund the building of the university.

Charles Eliot was appointed HKU's first Vice-Chancellor. As Governor of Hong Kong, Lugard laid the foundation stone of the Main Building on 16 March 1910. The university was incorporated in Hong Kong as a self-governing body of scholars on 30 March 1911 and had its official opening ceremony on 11 March 1912. It was founded as an all-male institution; women students were admitted for the first time ten years later.

As Lugard felt that the Chinese society at the time was not suited to ideals such as communism, the university originally emulated the University of Manchester in emphasising the sciences over the humanities. It opened with three founding faculties, Arts, Engineering and Medicine. The Faculty of Medicine was founded as the Hong Kong College of Medicine for Chinese by the London Missionary Society in 1887. Of the College's early alumni, the most renowned was Sun Yat-sen, who led the Chinese Revolution of 1911 which changed China from an empire to a republic. In December 1916, the university held its first convocation, with 23 graduates and five honorary graduates.

Move towards Chinese cultural education, and WW2

After the Canton-Hong Kong strikes of 1925 and 1926, the government moved towards greater integration of Eastern culture, increasing the number of Chinese courses. In 1927, a degree in Chinese was created. Donations from wealthy businessmen Tang Chi Ngong and Fung Ping Shan – after whom two campus buildings are named – triggered an emphasis on Chinese cultural education. In 1937, the Queen Mary Hospital opened. It has served as the university's teaching hospital ever since. In 1941, the Japanese invasion of Hong Kong caused damage to university buildings, and the university closed until 1945, during this period, the Medical College of The University of Hong Kong moved to Chengdu to run a school.

1945 to 2001
After the end of the Second World War, the university reopened and investment in law and the social sciences increased as post-war reconstruction efforts began in earnest. The Faculty of Social Sciences was established in 1967 and the Department of Law in 1969. The student population in 1961 was 2,000, quadrupled from 1941,
and in 1980 the number of students exceeded 5,500.

In 1958, the librarian of University of Hong Hong, Mrs. Dorothea Scott, organized a meeting of over 40 library practitioners at the Fung Ping Shan Library on 3 April to determine and establish a library association for Hong Kong, the Hong Kong Library Association.

In 1982, the Faculty of Dentistry, based at the Prince Philip Dental Hospital, was established. To this day, it remains Hong Kong's only faculty training dental professionals. In 1984, both the School of Architecture and School of Education became fully-fledged faculties and in the same year the Faculty of Law was created. The Faculty of Business and Economics was established in 2001 as the university's tenth and youngest faculty.

After 1989, the Hong Kong government began to emphasise local tertiary education in order to retain local students who would otherwise have studied abroad in the United Kingdom. Student places and course variety were greatly increased in preparation for the handover of Hong Kong. By 2001, the number of students had grown to 14,300 and the number of degree courses to over a hundred.

2001 to present
In 2002, Growing with Hong Kong: HKU and its Graduates – The First 90 Years was published by the Hong Kong University Press as a study of the impact of HKU's graduates on Hong Kong.

In January 2006, despite protest from a portion of students and alumni, the Faculty of Medicine was renamed as the Li Ka Shing Faculty of Medicine "as a recognition of the generosity" of Li Ka-shing and his foundation, which pledged HK$1 billion in support of the university's "general development as well as research and academic activities in medicine".

On 16 August 2011, Li Keqiang, Vice Premier of the People's Republic of China, began a three-day visit to promote development between Hong Kong and mainland China. The university was locked down. The mishandling by the police force caused the Hong Kong 818 incident. In a statement to the HKU community, the university vice-chancellor Professor Lap-Chee Tsui admitted that the security arrangements could have been better planned and organised, and apologised to students and alumni for not having been able to prevent the incident. He assured them that "the University campus belongs to students and teachers, and that it will always remain a place for freedom of expression". On 30 August 2011, the university council resolved to set up a panel to review issues arising from the vice premier's visit, to improve arrangements and to set up policies for future university events that are consistent with its commitment to freedom of expression.

From 2010 to 2012, the university celebrated its 100th anniversary and the opening of the Centennial Campus at the western end of the university site in Pokfulam. The University of Hong Kong–Shenzhen Hospital, one of the two teaching hospitals of the university, also opened in 2011.

On 10 April 2015, HKU declared itself as the first university in the world to join HeForShe, a UN Women initiative urging men to achieve more female rights. The university promised that it would triple the number of female dean-level members by 2020, so that more than 1 out of 5 deans would be women.

On 15 December 2017, the university's governing council appointed University of California, Berkeley nanoscience professor Xiang Zhang to the posts of President and Vice-Chancellor with effect from January 2018. Zhang was the first vice-chancellor of the university born in mainland China and educated to undergraduate degree level there.

2015 political interference

The HKU Council made headlines in 2015 for alleged political interference behind the selection process for a new pro-vice chancellor. A selection committee unanimously recommended the council appoint Johannes Chan to the post, which involved the responsibility for staffing and resources, and which had been left vacant for five years. Chan, the former dean of the Faculty of Law, was a distinguished scholar in constitutional law and human rights and "a vocal critic on Hong Kong’s political reform issues". Owing to his liberal political stance, Chan was roundly criticised by Communist Party-controlled media including Wen Wei Po, Ta Kung Pao, and Global Times, which together published at least 350 articles attacking him.

Customarily the HKU Council accepts the recommendations of search committees for senior posts, with no prior recommendation having been rejected by the council. The council was criticised when it delayed the decision to appoint Chan, stating that it should wait until a new provost was in place. Finally, in September 2015, the council rejected Chan's appointment (12 votes to eight) through an anonymous vote in a closed meeting, providing no reason for the decision. Political interference was widely suspected and the opacity of the council criticised.

The decision is seen widely viewed as a pro-government act of retaliation against "pro-democracy leaders and participants" and a blow to academic freedom. Six members of the council are directly appointed by the Chief Executive of Hong Kong, who acts as chancellor of all publicly funded tertiary institutions in the territory. Five members are delegates to the National People's Congress in Beijing and, as such, are obliged to toe the Communist Party line or risk expulsion. In overall Council makeup, university students and staff are outnumbered by members from outside the university.

The decision was decried by student groups including the Hong Kong University Students' Union and Hong Kong Federation of Students, faculty members, leading international law scholars, and legislators. They noted that the decision would serve as a warning to other academics not to engage in pro-democratic politics and would severely tarnish Hong Kong's reputation for academic freedom and education excellence. The law faculty also refuted the allegations against Chan. Billy Fung, student union president, revealed details of the discussion to the public and was subsequently expelled from the council.

Campuses

The university also has a few buildings in Sandy Bay Gap. HKU buildings are some of the few remaining examples of British Colonial architecture in Hong Kong. The university lends its name to HKU station, the main public transport access to the campus opened on 28 December 2014.

The Li Ka Shing Faculty of Medicine is situated 4.5 km southwest of the main campus, in the Southern District near Sandy Bay and Pokfulam. The medical campus includes Queen Mary Hospital, the William M.W. Mong Building and research facilities. The Faculty of Dentistry is situated in the Prince Philip Dental Hospital, Sai Ying Pun.

The university also operates the Kadoorie Agricultural Research Centre, which occupies  of land in the New Territories, and the Swire Institute of Marine Science at the southern tip of the d'Aguilar Peninsula on Hong Kong Island.

Main building

Constructed between 1910 and 1912, the Main Building is the university's oldest structure and was sponsored by Sir Hormusjee Naorojee Mody and designed by Architect Messrs Leigh & Orange. It is built in the post-renaissance style with red brick and granite and has two courtyards. The main elevation is articulated by four turrets with a central clock tower (a gift from Sir Paul Chater in 1930). The two courtyards were added in the south in 1952 and one floor in the end block in 1958. The building was originally used as classrooms and laboratories for the Faculty of Medicine and Engineering and was later the home of departments within the Faculty of Arts. The central Great Hall (Loke Yew Hall) is named after Loke Yew, a Malayan benefactor of the university in its early years. It became a declared monument in 1984.

Swire building
In around 1980, the Swire Group sponsored the building of a new residential hall in the eastern end of the campus. Because of the sponsorship, the new student residence was named Swire Building. The building was officially opened by Mr. John Anthony Swire  on 11 November 1980. In 1983, the colour orange was chosen to be the hall colour in the second Annual General Meeting since the colour was used as the background colour during the first open day of Swire Hall and no other halls were using orange as their hall colour.

In 1983, Mrs. J. Lau (Director of Centre Media Resources) provided a design for the hall logo. The Swire Hall Students' Association, HKUSU, then made some amendments to that design. The logo shows the words 'S' and 'H'. The design of the word 'S' looks like two hands holding each other, signifying that all hall-mates should co-operate with each other, and promoting the hall motto 'Unity and Sincerity'.

Hung Hing Ying Building
Financed by Sir Paul Chater, Professor G. P. Jordan and others, it was opened in 1919 by the Governor of Hong Kong Sir Reginald Stubbs and housed the students' union. After World War II, the building was used temporarily for administrative purposes. The East Wing was added in 1960. The building was converted into the Senior Common Room in 1974. It was named in honour of Mr Hung Hing-Ying in 1986 for his family's donations to the university. The building was subsequently used again for administrative purposes, and housed Department of Music and the Music Library until early 2013. It is currently used by the Development & Alumni Affairs Office. The two-storey Edwardian style structure is characterised by a central dome and the use of red brick to emulate the Main Building opposite. The building became a declared monument in 1995.

Tang Chi Ngong Building
The idea to establish a school of Chinese was proposed in the inter-war period. Construction of the premises began in 1929 following a donation from Tang Chi-ngong, father of the philanthropist Sir Tang Shiu-kin, after whom the building was named. It was opened by Sir William Peel, Governor of Hong Kong, in 1931 and since then further donations have been received for the endowment of teaching Chinese language and literature. The building has been used for other purposes since the 1970s but the name remained unchanged. At present, it houses the Centre of Asian Studies. This three-storey flat-roofed structure is surfaced with Shanghai plaster and became a declared monument in 1995.

Centennial campus

To provide additional space for students under the new four-year undergraduate curriculum the Centennial Campus was built at the western end of the main campus, which was previously occupied by the Water Supplies Department. The construction of the campus started in late 2009, and was completed in 2012, the first year of the introduction of the new academic structure in Hong Kong. In 2012, the Faculty of Arts, the Faculty of Law and the Faculty of Social Sciences moved to the Centennial Campus.

Academics

Admission
Admission to HKU is highly competitive. In 2016, the university received around 40,000 applications for undergraduate studies, over 16,000 of which were from outside the Hong Kong schools' system. For Mainland China applicants, the enrollment rate was 1 student for every 21 applications. According to a survey done by the Education18.com (The Hong Kong Education Net), HKU enrolled students with the best performance in HKDSE examination in 2012. Internationally, applicants with more than 5 A*s in their GCE A-Levels, 75/75 in the Taiwan GSAT, 45/45 in IB, and 16 5** Zhuangyuan (the top Gaokao scoring students in their province or city in mainland China) are amongst those matriculated into the University. The latest Global Admissions Profile, with information and data about last year's admission and current international opportunities for those admitted, and the International Admissions Brochure, with information about applications for admission, are available on the HKU website.

Undergraduate candidates are selected according to their relative merit in the local public examination (HKDSEE) and apply online via JUPAS. Other applicants, including overseas students or ones taking other examinations, are classified as non-JUPAS applicants who are required to apply via the official website, where postgraduate applications may also be made.

Teaching and learning
Most undergraduate courses are 4-year degrees while the medical and nursing programmes require two and one more year(s) of studies respectively. English is the main medium of instruction, and the University's Senate has endorsed English as the campus lingua franca. Starting from 2012, local students are required to take Academic English courses and Chinese language enhancement courses; however, students who are native-speakers of languages other than Chinese, and students who have not studied Chinese language in their secondary curriculum can be exempted from the Chinese course requirement. Cantonese credit-courses for Mainland Chinese and Taiwan students, and ab initio Mandarin Chinese and Cantonese credit-courses for international and exchange students are offered by the Chinese Language Centre, School of Chinese.

Research
The university is a founding member of Universitas 21, an international consortium of research-led universities, and a member of the Association for Pacific Rim Universities, the Association of Commonwealth Universities, Washington University in St. Louis’s McDonnell International Scholars Academy, and many others. HKU benefits from a large operating budget supplied by high levels of government funding compared to many Western countries. In 2018/19, the Research Grants Council (RGC) granted HKU a total research funding of HK$12,127 million (41.3% of overall RGC funding), which was the highest among all universities in Hong Kong. HKU professors were among the highest paid in the world as well, having salaries far exceeding those of their US counterparts in private universities. However, with the reduction of salaries in recent years, this is no longer the case.

HKU research output, researchers, projects, patents and theses are profiled and made publicly available in the HKU Scholars Hub. 100 members of academic staff (>10% of professoriate staff) from HKU are ranked among the world's top 1% of scientists by the Thomson Reuters' Essential Science Indicators, by means of the citations recorded on their publications. The university has the largest number of research postgraduate students in Hong Kong, making up approximately 10% of the total student population. All ten faculties and departments provide teaching and supervision for research (MPhil and PhD) students with administration undertaken by the Graduate School.

Libraries and museums

HKU Libraries (HKUL) was established in 1912, being the oldest academic library in Hong Kong with over 2.3 million current holdings. It comprises the Main Library and six specialist branch libraries: the Dental, Education, Fung Ping Shan (East Asian Language), Yu Chun Keung Medical, Lui Che Woo Law, and Music libraries. They are located in buildings around the campus with varying opening hours. A web-based library catalogue, DRAGON, allows one to search HKUL's books, journals and other resources.

The HKUL Digital Initiatives, through its digitisation projects, has opened up online access to local collections originally in print format. The first HKUL Digital Initiative, ExamBase, was launched in 1996 and other projects of scholarly interests were introduced. More digital projects are being developed to provide continuous access to digital content and services. It provides open access to Chinese and English academic and medical periodicals published in Hong Kong.

The three-storey Fung Ping Shan Building was erected in 1932 originally as a library for Chinese books. Named after its donor, the building consists of masonry on the ground level surmounted by a two-storey red-brick structure with ornamental columns topped by a pediment over its entrance. Since 1962, the Chinese books collection, now known as the Fung Ping Shan Library, was transferred to the university's Main Library and the whole building was converted into a museum for Chinese art and archaeology. Among its collections are ceramics, pottery and bronze sculptures. In 1996, the lowest three floors of the new Tsui Building were added to the old building to form the University Museum and Art Gallery.

Reputation and rankings 
HKU admits the highest number of top scorers from the Hong Kong Diploma of Secondary Education Examinations.

Overall Ranking 
HKU was ranked 21st worldwide in QS 2023, 31st worldwide in THE 2023, 96th worldwide in ARWU 2022, and 55th worldwide in US News 2023. 

The Aggregate Ranking of Top Universities (ARTU), which sorts universities based on their aggregate performance across THE, QS, and ARWU, ranked HKU 40th worldwide in 2022.

HKU is ranked as the most international university in the world by Times Higher Education.

HKU was ranked 51-60th worldwide in the THE World Reputation Ranking 2022.

China's Alumni Association placed it among the "6-Star Greater China's Universities" (the highest level) and it also topped the Association's 2014 Ranking of Institutions with the Most Best Disciplines in HK, Macau and Taiwan.

Subject Ranking

QS Subject Rankings 
In the QS World University Rankings by Subject 2022:

In the QS World University Rankings by Broad Subject Area 2022:

THE Subject Rankings 
In the Times Higher Education World University Rankings by Subjects (2023)

Other subject rankings 
HKU's MBA program is considered one of the best in Asia.
It is rated by The Economist as the 3rd in Asia.
Its "EMBA-Global Asia: Columbia/HKU/LBS" program is rated by the Financial Times as the 4th in the world and the 2nd in Asia.

Graduate Employability Ranking 
HKU graduates ranked 47th worldwide in the Times Higher Education's Global University Employability Ranking 2022, and 10th worldwide in the QS Graduate Employability Rankings 2022.

Student life
Student welfare is served by several units, including the Centre of Development and Resources for Students (CEDARS), which provides guidance for most areas of student life including career counselling, and the University Health Service, which provides health care, referrals and preventive services.

Demographics
According to the latest profile indicators, the student population of the university was 21,652 in 2008–2009, comprising 11,962 undergraduates, 7,326 taught postgraduates and 2,364 research postgraduates. In recent years, it has become a popular choice for international students, with 6,814 non-local students on campus (including exchange students) from 83 countries in 2012.

Halls and colleges

There are 20 residential halls and colleges for undergraduates, postgraduates and visitors.

The residential halls include:
 Main Campus – Swire Hall and Simon K. Y. Lee Hall, mainly for undergraduates. Graduate House and Robert Black College, primarily for postgraduates and visitors respectively.
 Sassoon Road Campus – Lee Hysan Hall, Richard Charles Lee Hall, Wei Lun Hall and Madam S. H. Ho Hall Residence for Medical Students.
 Jockey Club Student Village I (founded in 2001) – Lady Ho Tung Hall and Starr Hall.
 Jockey Club Student Village II (founded in 2005) – Morrison Hall, Lee Shau Kee Hall and Suen Chi Sun Hall.
  (founded in 2012) – made up of four residential colleges, Shun Hing College, Chi Sun College, Lap-Chee College and New College. They provide a total of 1,800 beds for students of whom 67% are non-local students.
 Other historical student residences include St. John's College, Ricci Hall and University Hall.

Moreover, there are three non-residential halls:
 Hornell Hall (male only)
 Lee Chi Hung Hall (co-educational)

Student organisations

Two officially recognised student bodies, the Hong Kong University Students' Union (HKUSU) and the Postgraduate Students Association (PGSA), give opportunities for students to participate in extracurricular activities. HKUSU existed in one form or another since 1912 and represents both undergraduate and postgraduate students, while its membership mainly consists of undergraduates. PGSA focuses on postgraduate students.

HKUSU offers more than a hundred clubs and associations for students. This organisation is renowned amongst student activists, having been the main driving force behind evicting a chancellor in recent years. There was controversy when the head of the union, Ayo Chan, said that some of the protesters involved in the Tiananmen Square massacre had acted irrationally. Many students thought his remarks were offensive and he was ousted by a vote in under one week. The Postgraduate Students Association represents the university's postgraduate students.

Study abroad programme
Through the Exchange Buddy Program, students from abroad can choose to be matched with local students whom they can correspond with before they arrive in Hong Kong. These local students greet the visiting students upon arrival at the airport, help them to settle into student residence and offer advice and support during their stay.

Every year, over 1,000 undergraduates participate in exchange programmes. As part of their HKU degree, they study at universities spanning 40 countries around the world with the support of the University Grants Committee, University of Hong Kong Foundation for Educational Development and Research, Hongkong Bank Foundation, UBC Alumni Association (Hong Kong), Dr. Lee Shiu Scholarships for Hong Kong and South-East Asia Academic Exchange, Shell (Hong Kong) Limited, C. V. Starr Scholarship Fund, and others. The university welcomes a similar number of students from those 340 partner universities onto the HKU campus to study each year.

Organisation and administration

Governance

Prior to Hong Kong's handover, the colony's Governor was the de jure chancellor of the University. That role was assumed by the city's Chief Executive following the handover.

The Chief Executive's role as the university's Chancellor is enshrined in the University of Hong Kong Ordinance.

For a list of pre and post-handover university chancellors, refer to the articles for the Governor of Hong Kong and the Chief Executive of Hong Kong.

The Court

The Court is a large overseeing and legislative body comprising University and lay members. The purpose of the Court is to represent the wider interests of the communities served by the University. It has the power to make, repeal and amend statutes.

The Senate

The Senate is the principal academic authority of the University. It is responsible for all academic matters and welfare of students. Its 50 members are mainly academic staff while there are also student representatives.

The Council
The Council is the body which governs the university. It is responsible for the management of financial and human resources of the university and for the university’s future developments. The council comprises university members (both staff and students) and lay members (i.e. neither staff nor students of the university), with a ratio of lay to university members of 2:1 members are serving on the council as trustees in their personal capacity. (Membership)

The Chief Executive of Hong Kong has the power to appoint the chairman and six other members of the 24-person council. The vice-chancellor is in turn appointed by the council, although two seats are vacant.

The university has ten faculties, namely the Faculties of Architecture, Arts, Business & Economics, Dentistry, Education, Engineering, Law, Science, Social Sciences, and the Li Ka Shing Faculty of Medicine, alongside a graduate school and a number of non-faculty academic units, which provide various study programmes and courses for students. The medium of instruction in most classes is English.

Additionally, HKU operates two associate institutions:
 HKU SPACE (School of Professional and Continuing Education), which was first established as the Department of Extramural Studies in 1956, and later renamed in 1992. It solely awards 2-year associate degrees, 2-year Diplomas, Advanced or Higher Diploma Programmes (2-years to 3-years), 1-year Certificates, and individual courses. It also partners with overseas post-secondary institutions, colleges and universities.
 Centennial College, a liberal arts college established in 2012. It has provided self-financed 4-year bachelor's degree programmes for HKALE, HKDSE and other graduates from September 2012.

Shield, motto and coat of arms

The design of the university's shield of arms was proposed to the College of Arms by the university in October 1912. On 14 May 1913, the shield, along with two mottoes (one in Latin, one in Chinese) was granted by the College of Arms. The field resembles the lions on the coat of arms of England, whereas the book on the shield is a common reference to university's role in learning and knowledge.

The Latin motto Sapientia et Virtus is translated into English as "Wisdom and Virtue". The Chinese motto on the pages of the opened book, written from top to bottom, right to left in accordance with traditional Chinese writing direction, contains two phrases: 明德 (ming tak) and 格物 (kak mat), meaning "illustrious virtue" and "the investigation of things" respectively. The first phrase ming tak makes homage to the opening sentence of classic Confucian Classical Chinese literature the Great Learning, in which the author discusses the three great duties of a ruler: illustrious virtue, the renewal of the people, and repose in the highest good. The second phrase kak mat is a reference to the writing of Confucian scholar Zhu Xi 致知在格物 (lit. exhausting by examination the principles of things and affairs). The phrase occurs in discussion regarding how wise rulers set about cultivating wisdom and virtue. If one desires to rectify their heart, they must first sought to be sincere in their thoughts. Wishing to be sincere in their thoughts, they must first extended to the utmost their knowledge. Such extension of knowledge lay in the investigation of things.

In 1981, the year of the university's 70th anniversary, an application was made to the College of Arms for a full achievement of arms, which was granted in 1984, comprising the original shield and mottoes with the addition of a crest, supporters, a helmet and compartment. The supporters of the coat of arms are a Chinese dragon and a lion representing Britain, indicating the university's aspiration to blend East and West cultures, from the foundation by British people in Hong Kong and the later development of the university's research and studies in both west and east culture and technology, whereas the compartment is an allusion to Hong Kong Island, where the university is located.

University anthem

The recording of the reconstructed University Anthem was recorded by the Hong Kong Sinfonietta, the Diocesan Choral Society and HKU Students' Union Choir, conducted by the Sinfonietta's musical director, Yip Wing-sie, with new orchestration by Dr Chan Hing-yan, Chairperson of the Department of Music.

Controversies and incidents

 In 2014, a big ship crashed into the Hong Kong University playground. No one was killed but there was some structural damage. 
 10 February 2018 - Maxim's restaurant at HKU was the site of an anti shark finning protest.
 15 February 2018 - HKU robotics professor Xi Ning was charged with submitting fraudulent requests for travel reimbursement to his previous employer, Michigan State University, and IEEE. After a trial resulted in a hung jury, the federal government dropped the charges.
 3 December 2020 - HKU mechanical engineering associate professor Cheung Kie-Chung was convicted for murdering his wife.
 23 December 2021 - HKU removed the Pillar of Shame, a memorial to the 1989 Tiananmen Square protests and massacre. This act is widely regarded by the public as a violation of Hong Kong as the last land under the rule of the CCP where people can discuss and commemorate the protests and massacre, and an injury to freedom, democracy and human rights.

Notable alumni

The University of Hong Kong has educated many notable alumni in many varied fields. Among them is Dr Sun Yat-sen, the founder of the Republic of China, who was a graduate of the Hong Kong College of Medicine for Chinese, the predecessor of HKU. Over 40 principal officials, permanent secretaries, Executive Council and Legislative Council members of the Hong Kong SAR Government are HKU graduates. HKU graduates also form the senior management teams of many large organizations in the private sector. 

In recent years Professor Guan Yi became a notable figure when his research and work on SARS led to the successful identification of the SARS-Coronavirus and its infectious source from live animal markets and helped the Chinese Government successfully avert the second SARS outbreak in early 2004.

See also

 Vice-Chancellors of the University of Hong Kong
 Education in Hong Kong
 Hong Kong University Students' Union
 List of buildings and structures in Hong Kong
 List of higher education institutions in Hong Kong
 List of oldest universities in continuous operation
 The University of Hong Kong Faculty of Law
 The Asian Institute of International Financial Law

References

External links

 
 HKU University Archives finding aids

University of Hong Kong
1911 establishments in Hong Kong
Educational institutions established in 1911
Declared monuments of Hong Kong